

Results
Arsenal's score comes first

Football League First Division

Final League table

FA Cup

References

1905-06
English football clubs 1905–06 season